James Murphy, FAIA, (1834–1907) was an Irish-American architect active in late-nineteenth- and early twentieth-century New England, who designed numerous Roman Catholic churches and related structures.

Early life and career

Murphy was born in 1834 in County Tipperary, Ireland. In 1852, he emigrated to the United States along with his brother Michael. Soon after his arrival, he entered the Brooklyn, New York firm of Patrick C. Keely as an apprentice. Keely was already an established architect specializing in ecclesiastical design. Eventually, Murphy became a partner in the firm, operating as Keely & Murphy. Murphy would later marry Keely's sister-in-law.

Architectural practice

By the mid-1860s, the duo opened a branch office in Providence, Rhode Island. In 1875, the partnership was dissolved and Murphy established his own practice. Murphy continued to specialize in church design for the ever-growing number of Roman Catholic parishes during the late nineteenth century, particularly in the southern New England area of Massachusetts, Rhode Island, and Connecticut.

In the 1880s and 1890s, Murphy employed his nephew, Ambrose J. Murphy, who would later partner with Frank R. Hindle. Some time around 1900, Murphy established a new office in Boston, Massachusetts.

In 1870, Murphy joined the American Institute of Architects, and was elevated to Fellowship in 1885.

Personal life
James Murphy married Patrick Charles Keely's sister-in-law. Murphy had a brother, Michael Murphy, with whom he emigrated to America. The architect, Ambrose J. Murphy, was his nephew. Murphy died April 18, 1907 at the Holy Ghost Hospital (Cambridge, Massachusetts) in Cambridge, Massachusetts.

Legacy
Ambrose J. Murphy continued James Murphy's firm after 1907. He entered into partnership with Frank R. Hindle to form the firm of Murphy & Hindle, which practiced architecture in Rhode Island until the 1940s. That firm also specialized in church design.

Architectural works

Churches

 1862 - St. Bridget, 455 Plymouth St, Abington, Massachusetts
 1864 - St. Gregory, 2223 Dorchester Ave, Dorchester, Massachusetts
 Demolished
 1864 - St. Mary, 540 Broadway, Providence, Rhode Island
 1866 - St. Mary, 134 Norfolk St, Cambridge, Massachusetts
 A Keely & Murphy project
 1867 - St. John, 72 S Main St, Concord, New Hampshire
 A Keely & Murphy project
 1867 - St. Mary, 669 West Ave, Norwalk, Connecticut
 1868 - Immaculate Conception, 11 Prospect St, Marlborough, Massachusetts
 1868 - St. Michael, Prairie & Oxford, Providence, Rhode Island
 Replaced in 1915, burned 1970s
 1869 - Our Lady of Mercy, 500 Main St, East Greenwich, Rhode Island
 Demolished
 1869 - St. Bernard, 240 Water St, Fitchburg, Massachusetts
 1870 - St. Joseph, 264 Washington St, Somerville, Massachusetts
 1870 - St. Mary, 5 Hillhouse Ave, New Haven, Connecticut
 1870 - St. Patrick, 7 East St, Whitinsville, Massachusetts
 Demolished
 1871 - Holy Trinity, 133 Main St, Greenfield, Massachusetts
 1871 - St. John, 17 Chestnut St, Peabody, Massachusetts
 1871 - St. John, 352 Atwells Ave, Providence, Rhode Island
 Demolished in 1992
 1872 - St. John, 63 Church St, Slatersville, Rhode Island
 1873 - Our Lady Help of Christians, 573 Washington St, Newton, Massachusetts
 1873 - St. John, 279 Atlantic St, Stamford, Connecticut
 1873 - St. Patrick, 213 Broadway, Norwich, Connecticut
 Cathedral status in 1952
 1874 - Sacred Heart of Jesus, 166 Cross St, Gardner, Massachusetts
 Burned in 1889
 1875 - Notre Dame du Sacre Coeur, 222 E Main St, North Adams, Massachusetts
 1875 - St. Joseph, 115 Union St, Lynn, Massachusetts
 1878 - St. Mary, 90 7th St, Turners Falls, Massachusetts
 1880 - St. Patrick, Main & Park, Williamstown, Massachusetts
 Demolished
 1881 - St. Francis, 318 Church St, Naugatuck, Connecticut
 1881 - St. Mary, 30 Bartlett St, Westfield, Massachusetts
 1881 - St. Thomas, 2 E Main St, Huntington, Massachusetts
 1882 - St. Mary, 239 Greenwood Ave, Bethel, Connecticut
 1885 - St. Louis, 440 Bradford Ave, Fall River, Massachusetts
 Demolished in 2010
 1885 - St. Mary, 103 Pine St, Pawtucket, Rhode Island
 1888 - Holy Rosary, Mosher & West, Holyoke, Massachusetts
 Demolished
 1888 - Sacred Heart, 387 Chestnut St, Springfield, Massachusetts
 1889 - Holy Trinity, 134 Fuller Ave, Central Falls, Rhode Island
 Demolished
 1889 - St. Edward, 997 Branch Ave, Wanskuck, Rhode Island
 1889 - St. Margaret, 1098 Pawtucket Ave, Rumford, Rhode Island
 Burned in 1988
 1889 - St. Patrick, 170 Thompson St, Bridgeport, Connecticut
 Completed by Dwyer & McMahon in 1910
 1890 - St. Patrick, 220 Bates St, Lewiston, Maine
 1892 - St. Edward, 458 Main St, Medfield, Massachusetts
 Demolished
 1892 - St. Patrick, 46 E Central St, Natick, Massachusetts
 1896 - Holy Name, 99 Camp St, Providence, Rhode Island
 1896 - St. Mary, 17 Waterville St, North Grafton, Massachusetts
 Burned in 1948
 1896 - St. Thomas, Columbia St, Adams, Massachusetts
 1902 - St. Peter, 16 Russell St, Great Barrington, Massachusetts

Other buildings

 1872 - St. John Rectory, 63 Church St, Slatersville, Rhode Island
 1881 - St. Michael Hall and School, 260 State St, Springfield, Massachusetts
 Demolished
 1883 - St. Bernard Rectory, 240 Water St., Fitchburg, Massachusetts
 1898 - Tyler School, Plain & Maple, Providence, Rhode Island
 The cathedral school, demolished

See also
Patrick W. Ford, a contemporary church architect.

References

1834 births
1907 deaths
American ecclesiastical architects
Gothic Revival architects
Architects of Roman Catholic churches
Architects from Providence, Rhode Island
 
Fellows of the American Institute of Architects
Architects of cathedrals
Irish emigrants to the United States (before 1923)